Jozzen Cuesta Padrón is a Cuban professional baseball infielder.

Career
Cuesta played for Ciego de Ávila in the Cuban National Series. Cuesta went missing in August before the Cuba national baseball team could win the championship of the 2013 World Baseball Challenge against in Japan in Canada in Prince George, BC, in August. It was believed that Cuesta defected from Cuba to pursue a career in Major League Baseball and meet up with his wife who had gone to the United States three months earlier.

References

External links

1980s births
Living people
Defecting Cuban baseball players
Place of birth missing (living people)